Staromusino (İśke Musa) is a rural locality (a village) in Pervomaysky Selsoviet, Meleuzovsky District, Bashkortostan, Russia. The population was 66 as of 2010. There is 1 street.

Geography 
Staromusino is located 12 km southeast of Meleuz (the district's administrative centre) by road. Pervomayskaya is the nearest rural locality.

References 

Rural localities in Meleuzovsky District